Wendelstein is a municipality in the district of Roth, in Bavaria, Germany, located about  southeast of Nuremberg.

Geography
Wendelstein is about 13 km south-southeast of the center of the city of Nuremberg in the Schwarzach Valley. To the north it borders Nuremberg, to the east Feucht, Schwarzenbruck and Pyrbaum, to the south Allersberg and Schwanstetten and to the west Rednitzhembach and Schwabach. The municipal area also includes an uninhabited exclave, one square kilometer in size, of Lorenzer Reichswald north of a former ammunition dump, Heeresmunitionsanstalt Feucht.

Notable inhabitants

 Johann Cochlaus (1479–1552), humanist and theologian

References

External links

Roth (district)